Aminatu is a given name it may refer to:

Aminatou Haidar, often known simply as Aminatu, a human-rights defender and political activist from Western Sahara
Amina, also known as Aminatu, a Muslim princess and military leader from Nigeria
Aminatu Ibrahim, a football (soccer) player on the Ghana women's national football team